Barmer District is a district in Rajasthan state of India. It is located in the western part of Rajasthan state forming a part of the Thar Desert. Barmer is the third largest district by area in Rajasthan and fifth largest district in India. Occupying an area of 28,387 km2. Being in the western part of the state, it includes a part of the Thar Desert. Jaisalmer is to the north of this district while Jalore is in its south. Pali and Jodhpur form its eastern border and it shares a border with Pakistan in the west. Partially being a desert, this district has a large variation in temperature. The temperature in summer can rise up to 51 °C and falls near to 0 °C in winter. Luni is the longest river in Barmer district. After travelling a length of almost 500 km, it passes through Jalore and merges in the marshy land of Runn of Kutch. 
 District headquarters is in the town of Barmer. The other major towns in the district are: Balotra, Guda Malani, Baytoo, Siwana, and Chohatan. Recently, a large onshore oil field has been discovered and made functional in Barmer district. Now Barmer is also famous for Pomegrante . A village near Balotra name,  Budiwada  is named by Anar village.  For reference check map of budiwada..

History 
In earlier times, the district was known as Malani, in the name of Rawal Mallinath Rathore (मल्लिनाथ). Rawal Mallinath was the son of Rao Salkha and Rawal Mallinath is cultural, philanthropical and religious icon in Barmer, He is worshiped as God by local peoples. The whole area around the river Luni was said to have Malani (मलानी), derived from the name Mallinath. Present name of Barmer is derived from its founder ruler Bahada Rao or Bar Rao Parmar (Juna Barmer), it was named Bahadamer ("The Hill Fort of Bahada"). He built a small town which is presently known as "Juna" which is 25 km from present city of Barmer. After Parmer's, Rawat Luka -Grand Son of Rawal Mallinath, establish their kingdom in Juna Barmer with help of his brother Rawal Mandalak. They defeated Parmers of Juna & made it their capital. Thereafter, his descendant, Rawat Bhima, who was a great warrior, established the present city of Barmer in 1552 AD and shifted his capital to Barmer from Juna.
.

Geography
Barmer is located in the western part of the state forming a part of the Thar Desert. The district borders Jaisalmer district in the north, Jalore district in the south, Pali district and Jodhpur district in the east, and Pakistan in the west. The district borders Tharpakar district of Sindh, the district with the largest population of Hindus in Pakistan.

After Jaisalmer district and Bikaner district, it is the third largest district of Rajasthan. It is also the fifth largest district in the country.

The district is located between 24,58' to 26, 32'N Latitudes and 70, 05' to 72, 52' E Longitudes.

The longest river in the district is the Luni. It is 480 km in length and drain into the Gulf of Kutch passing through Jalore. The variation in temperature in various seasons is quite high owing to arid thar desert and sandy soil. In summers the temperature soars to 46 °C to 51 °C. In winters it drops to 0 °C (41 °F). Primarily Barmer district is a desert where average rainfall in a year is 277 mm. However, extreme rainfall of 549 mm rain between 16 and 25 August 2006 left many dead and huge losses due to flood in a nearby town Kawas and whole town submerged. As many as twenty new lakes formed, with six covering an area of over 10 km2.

Poorly planned and rapid urbanisation has increased Barmer's vulnerability to flash flooding. The local ecology and soil type is not equipped to deal with sudden or excessive water accumulation, which causes short- and long-term damage. Other areas suffer the gradual effects of 'invisible disasters', which also threaten the lives and livelihoods of the locals.

Climate

Economy
In 2016 the Ministry of Panchayati Raj named Barmer one of the country's 250 most backward districts (out of a total of 640). It is one of the twelve districts in Rajasthan currently receiving funds from the Backward Regions Grant Fund Programme (BRGF).

Demographics

At the time of the 2011 census, the district had a population of 2,603,751. Its population growth rate over the decade 2001–2011 was 32.52%. Barmer has a sex ratio of 902 females for every 1000 males, and a literacy rate of 56.53%. 6.98% of the population lives in urban areas. Scheduled Castes and Scheduled Tribes made up 16.76% and 6.77% of the population respectively.

Languages 

At the time of the 2011 census, 61.14% of the population spoke Marwari, 32.93% Rajasthani, 2.83% Sindhi and 1.60% Hindi as their first language. People in the west of the district along the border with Pakistan speak Dhatki, a mix of Marwari and Sindhi.

People and culture
Barmer district is part of the Great Indian Desert or Thar Desert. Like all other districts in the desert region, Barmer is known for its folk music and dance. The Bhopas (priest singers) are found in Barmer, who compose music in honour of the deities of the region and its war heroes. The other folk musicians come from a community called the Muslim Dholis (drummers) for most of whom this is the only means of livelihood. Langas and Manganiars are the some of these communities. People speak mostly Rajasthani, while Hindi is the official language here. Scheduled Castes and Scheduled Tribes make up 16.8% and 6.8% of the population respectively.

Barmer is known for its carved wooden furniture and hand block printing industry.

Mallinath cattle fair - It takes place every year during month of April. The fair takes place in Tilwara, an area also known for archaeological discoveries, and goes on for two weeks. This fair is one of the biggest cattle fair of India.

Tourism

Barmer is famous for its historic monuments and the temples which are located in the region. Barmer city houses number of such temples which attract tourists from all over the country. The city is very famous for the temple of Goddess Jagdamba. It is an ancient temple and the archaeologists suggest that the temple is as old as 500 years. The Jagdambe Mata temple is located at a height of around 140 m above plain land.

Barmer is also famous for the cattle fair (Tilwara) which is organised every year. The place is also renowned for camel milk, hand block printing, woollen industries, carved wooden furniture and handicrafts.

The major festival of the region is the Thar festival which is organised every year by the government to attract more and more tourists to the region. The festival is organised in the month of March every year.

Administration
Barmer is the headquarters of the district, which is the principal town also, for the administrative purposes. The district is divided into 4 sub-divisions viz, Barmer, Balotra, Sheo and Guda Malani.

Tehsils
 
The Barmer sub-division has 11 tehsils:-
Barmer 
Baytoo 
Chohtan 
Dhorimana 
Gadra Road 
Gira 
Guda Malani
Nokhra 
Pachpadra 
Ramsar
Samadari 
Sheo  
Siwana
 
The total of 2,160 villages in Barmer District come under Seventeen Panchayat Samitis.

Oil Industry 
Once known as "kala pani" where government employees were sent on punishment postings because of its desert, water problems, and border area. In 2009, the Barmer district came into the news due to its large Oil basin. The British exploration company Cairn Energy is going to start the production soon in the year 2009 on the large scale. Mangala, Bhagyam and Aishwariya are the major oil fields in the district. This is India's biggest oil discovery in 22 years. Cairn works in partnership with state owned Oil and Natural Gas Corporation (ONGC). Cairn holds 70% in the field, while state-run ONGC holds the remaining 30%. In March 2010, Cairn increased oil potential from this field to 6.5 billion barrels of oil – from an earlier estimate of 4 billion barrels.

Underground airbase
Uttarlai military airbase is situated in Barmer district, Uttarlai is India's first under ground airbase. The Battle of Longewala (4 December 1971 – 5 December 1971) was one of the first major engagements in the Western Sector during the Indo-Pakistani War of 1971, fought between assaulting Pakistani forces and Indian defenders at the border post of Longewala.

See also 

 Thar Desert
 Tharparkar

References

External links

  
 
 
 

 
Districts of Rajasthan
Districts in Jodhpur division
Thar Desert